Kreutzberg is a German surname, and may refer to:
 Karl Kreutzberg (1912–1977), German field handball player
 Harald Kreutzberg (1902–1968), German dancer and choreographer
 Georg Kreutzberg (1932–2019), German neurobiologist

See also 
 Creuzberg (disambiguation)
 Kreuzberg (disambiguation)
 Kreuzburg (disambiguation)

German-language surnames